Hollister High School (HHS) is a school in Hollister, California, United States. It serves as the primary high school for Hollister city residents and most county residents and is within the San Benito High School District. The school's enrollment is approximately 3,400 students, served by 250 faculty and staff.

History 

The San Juan school district was created in 1852, and split off the Hollister school district in 1869.  High school education in Hollister began in 1875 alongside the grammar school located at First Street and San Benito Street.  Hollister school district built another schoolhouse in 1875, and expanded the original building in 1881.  During this time, education was not mandatory nor was it free, and enrollment remained relatively low for years. Attendance increased as Hollister grew.

A new school building was commissioned in 1908 and completed the following year, during Hollister's post-earthquake construction period that also built Hazel Hawkins Memorial Hospital and City Hall.  This is still used as the main administration building.  Further construction brought the O'Donnell Gym and Davis Library.  But most of the facilities were destroyed in a fire in 1955, with only the administration offices surviving.  Repairs were made, and further expansions over the years, including an extension to the library after 1980.

In the 2000s there were more than 120 classrooms, with thousands of students and hundreds of faculty.

Academics 

Hollister High School runs on an alternating block schedule split into "red days," periods 1 through 3, and "white days," periods 4 through 6. The days are named after the school's main colors. Each block is 100 minutes long, except for the 1st block of the day (1st and 4th period) which is 105 minutes to allow the reading of the school bulletin. There is also an optional, 65-minute 0 (zero) period, that is run before school, Tuesday through Friday.

The school offers standard general education courses, 15 Advanced Placement courses, and many electives. Electives include arts such as ceramics, drama, choir, and band; language electives such as Modern American Literature and Shakespeare; and technical and vocational courses like auto shop. The school also prides itself on its large student government and leadership class. HHS has been a member school of the California Association of Student Councils since 1994. Some of the more active electives are agricultural classes, computer/business classes, and Hispanic Studies classes, such as Hispanic Literature and Chicano History.

Dancing for Diana 

In early 2010, Hollister High School's Associated Student Body came together to help raise money for Diana Magaña, who at the time was a freshman student who was battling cancer. The ASB set a goal of $15,000, and ended up surpassing this with an end amount of over $22,000. The students put together a viral dancing video which reached all over the globe. This, along with their Benefit Ball dance, helped the surrounding community come together and raise money for Diana. In February 2012, Diana died at the age of 17.

Athletics 
The schools athletics teams are known by the school's mascot, the Haybaler, or more commonly the 'Balers. The school's colors are red and white. The team competes in 13 sports in the Monterey Bay League as part of the Central Coast Section.

The arch rival for the Balers is the Gilroy Mustangs. The team's annual football game is called the Prune Bowl, named for the trees that used to line Highway 25, which connects the two cities. Hollister has dominated the game in recent years, winning eight of the past ten games and holding a 30-23-1 advantage since the VFW Memorial Trophy came into existence in 1956. The trophy goes annually to the game's winner.

Prune Bowl history

 2012 Hollister 70-0
 2011 Hollister 39-3
 2010 Hollister 34-32
 2009 Gilroy 35-30
 2008 Gilroy 47-0
 2007 Gilroy 57-27
 2006 Hollister 29-21 
 2005 Hollister 50-20 
 2004 Hollister 7-6 
 2003 Hollister 37-7 
 2002 Hollister 41-6 
 2001 Gilroy 37-21 
 2000 Hollister 32-12 
 1999 Hollister 34-13 
 1998 Gilroy 18-14 
 1997 Hollister 27-21 
 1996 Hollister 12-7 
 1995 Hollister 28-13 
 1994 Hollister 35-17 
 1993 Gilroy 7-3 
 1992 Hollister 19-15 
 1991 Gilroy 17-14 
 1990 Gilroy 20-8 
 1989 Gilroy 24-13 
 1988 Gilroy 10-0 
 1987 Gilroy 9-0 
 1986 Tie 14-14 
 1985 Gilroy 50-28 
 1984 Gilroy 40-30 
 1983 Hollister 29-15 
 1982 Gilroy 7-6 
 1981 Gilroy 23-9 
 1980 Gilroy 41-28 
 1979 Hollister 21-6 
 1978 Hollister 6-0 
 1977 Hollister 6-2 
 1976 Hollister 25-0 
 1975 Hollister 28-6 
 1974 Gilroy 21-8 
 1973 Hollister 6-0 
 1972 Hollister 21-6 
 1971 Hollister 14-0 
 1970 Gilroy 15-6 
 1969 Hollister 50-6 
 1968 Hollister 13-6 
 1967 NO GAME 
 1966 Hollister 13-7 
 1965 Hollister 7-6 
 1964 Gilroy 13-7 
 1963 Gilroy 7-0 
 1962 Gilroy 15-0 
 1961 Hollister 31-7 
 1960 Gilroy 19-13 
 1959 Hollister 7-6 
 1958 Gilroy 34-6 
 1957 Hollister 6-0 
 1956 Hollister 13-0

In the 2006-07 season, much history was made at the school. The volleyball team won the CCS title for the first time in school history in the fall, and the boys' and girls' water polo teams hosted and won a CCS playoff game for the first time. The girls soccer team won their first league title in school history and hosted a CCS game for the first time in the Andy Hardin stadium. The spring was particularly kind, with the 'Balers winning five league titles (boys' track, girls' track, boys' swimming, baseball, and softball). The baseball team advanced to its first-ever CCS championship game, where it lost to Valley Christian. The softball beat Carlmont for its second straight CCS title. Its championship in 2005-06 was the school's first softball title. The team finished the season ranked 50th in the country by Student Sports. The baseball and softball teams reaching the finals in the same season marks only the eighth time in CCS history that has occurred. Only the 2005 Archbishop Mitty teams have been able to win both titles.

In 2008, both the boys' and girls' track teams won TCAL titles making it the second straight for the girls and the seventh straight for the boys. Also in 2008, the girls' softball team went undefeated in TCAL play, the first team to do so in the history of the league.

Notable alumni
Conner Menez, Major League Baseball player for the San Francisco Giants

References

Public high schools in California
Schools in San Benito County, California
1875 establishments in California
Educational institutions established in 1875